Ashu Cyprian Besongo (born 21 October 1969) is a Cameroonian football manager and former player.

Career
Besong was born in Germany.

In 2005, he was a coach at Welwyn Garden City. He was a U21 assistant coach at Leicester City.

In July 2019, he was appointed as manager of the South Sudan national team.

References 

Living people
1969 births
German people of Cameroonian descent
Cameroonian footballers
German footballers
Borussia Mönchengladbach II players
Fortuna Düsseldorf II players
Unisport Bafang players
Cameroonian football managers
German football managers
Association football coaches
South Sudan national football team managers
Leicester City F.C. non-playing staff
German expatriate football managers
Cameroonian expatriate football managers
Association footballers not categorized by position